Trilosporidae is a family of cnidarians belonging to the order Multivalvulida.

Genera:
 Trilospora Noble, 1939
 Unicapsula Davis, 1924

References

Cnidarian families
Multivalvulida